The 1945 NCAA Golf Championship was the seventh annual NCAA-sanctioned golf tournament to determine the individual and team national champions of men's collegiate golf in the United States.

The tournament was held at the Ohio State University Golf Club in Columbus, Ohio.

Host Ohio State won the team title, finishing 19 strokes ahead of second-place finishers Michigan and Northwestern. This was the Buckeyes' first NCAA golf title. 

The individual championship was won by John Lorms, also from Ohio State.

Contested during the midst of World War II, only five teams contested the tournament.

Team results

DC = Defending champions

References

NCAA Men's Golf Championship
Golf in Ohio
NCAA Golf Championship
NCAA Golf Championship
NCAA Golf Championship